Benefiel Corner is an unincorporated community in Hamilton Township, Sullivan County, in the U.S. state of Indiana.

The community is part of the Terre Haute Metropolitan Statistical Area.

History
Benefiel Corner was named after the local Benefiel family of settlers.

Geography

References

Unincorporated communities in Sullivan County, Indiana
Unincorporated communities in Indiana
Terre Haute metropolitan area